o.k., sometimes spelled O.K., is a 1970 West German anti-war film written and directed by Michael Verhoeven. It was chosen as West Germany's official submission to the 43rd Academy Awards for Best Foreign Language Film, but did not receive a nomination. The film was also entered into the 20th Berlin International Film Festival. However, the competition was cancelled and no prizes were awarded, over controversy surrounding the film.

Plot
A four-man US fireteam on patrol seizes a passing young Vietnamese girl and continues to torture and kill her. Only one soldier refuses to take part in it and reports this incident to his superior, who dismisses it as simple wartime incident. As a consequence of his report, the soldier has to fear for his life. Later, the perpetrators are convicted, although subsequent appeals reduce their sentences significantly.

The plot takes place in a Bavarian forest and reenacts the 1966 Incident on Hill 192 during the Vietnam War. The soldiers wear US uniforms, have authentic names, but speak with a pronounced Bavarian accent—a conscious directing decision known as the Brechtian distancing effect.

Cast
 Gustl Bayrhammer - Captain Vorst
 Hartmut Becker - Ralph Clarke
 Senta Berger - Herself
 Hanna Burgwitz - Josefine
  - Reilly
 Wolfgang Fischer - Rafe
 Eva Mattes - Phan Ti Mao
 Ewald Precht - Soldier Diaz
 Vera Rheingold
 Peter van Anft
 Michael Verhoeven - Sven
 Friedrich von Thun - Sergeant Tony Meserve
 Rolf Zacher - Rowan

Controversy
During the 1970 Berlin Film Festival, the jury, headed by American film director George Stevens, decided after a 7–2 vote to remove the film from the competition justifying their decision by citing a FIAPF (International Federation of Film Producers Associations) guideline that said: "All film festivals should contribute to better understanding between nations". This accusation was based on the fact that the film depicted four American soldiers kidnapping, raping, stabbing, and shooting a Vietnamese woman named Mao until she finally dies. A fifth soldier on the patrol refuses to take part in the attack on the woman and his report to his commander is buried in the files. Stevens, who had served during the Second World War, claimed that the film was anti-American.

One jury member, Dušan Makavejev, protested against this measure, stood up for the film and supported Verhoeven and producer Rob Houwer. Verhoeven defended his film by stating in these terms: "I have not made an anti-American film. If I were an American, I would even say my film is pro‐American. The biggest part of the American people today is against the war in Vietnam".

Other directors that were taking part in the festival withdrew their films in protest. The jury was accused of censorship and eventually disbanded, therefore no prizes were awarded and the competition was suspended. This scandal had such a big effect that it was unclear if the festival would continue to take place the next year.

See also
 Casualties of War, also depicting the Incident on Hill 192
 List of submissions to the 43rd Academy Awards for Best Foreign Language Film
 List of German submissions for the Academy Award for Best Foreign Language Film

References

External links

 o.k. at filmportal.de/en

1970 films
1970s avant-garde and experimental films
German avant-garde and experimental films
West German films
1970s German-language films
Films directed by Michael Verhoeven
Films produced by Rob Houwer
Anti-war films about the Vietnam War
Vietnam War films
German black-and-white films
Films about rape
1970s German films